Rio de Janeiro is a station on Line A of the Buenos Aires Underground. The station was opened on 1 April 1914 as the western terminus of the extension of the line from Plaza Miserere. On 1 July 1914 the line was extended to the west Primera Junta.

References

External links

Buenos Aires Underground stations
Railway stations opened in 1914
1914 establishments in Argentina